Saliou Diallo (born 3 November 1976) is a retired Guinean football goalkeeper.

Career
Diallo started his career at Hafia in 1994 before moving to Deinze in Belgium in 1997. Diallo signed for Westerlo in 1998 before moving to Turkey in 1999 with Gaziantepspor for a season. Diallo spent two seasons with Yimpaş Yozgatspor before signing for Diyarbakırspor for a season and then moved to Azerbaijan with Shamkir. Diallo stayed at Shamkir for a season and a half before moving to Genclerbirliyi Sumqayit in 2005 where he made 50 league appearances before retiring in 2007.

International career
Diallo was a member of the Guinean squad's that went to the 1994 and 1998 African Cup of Nations.

Career statistics

References

External links
 
 

1976 births
Expatriate footballers in Azerbaijan
Expatriate footballers in Turkey
People with acquired Guinean citizenship
Guinean footballers
Guinea international footballers
Living people
Gaziantepspor footballers
Association football goalkeepers
FK Genclerbirliyi Sumqayit players